William Philpott  (24 January 1819 – 4 November 1891) was an Australian cricketer. He played two first-class cricket matches for Victoria. Philpott holds the distinction for having been the captain of the Victorian cricket team for the first ever first-class cricket match played in Australia, from 11 February 1851 to 12 February 1851. This match was also the first intercolonial match played in Australia. The match was played against Tasmania, which eventually won the timeless match after two-days of play. Thus, Philpott became the first ever losing captain in first-class cricket in Australia.

See also
 List of Victoria first-class cricketers

References

1819 births
1891 deaths
Australian cricketers
Victoria cricketers
People from West Farleigh
Melbourne Cricket Club cricketers